Dirty Lettuce is a Black-owned vegan restaurant serving Southern, Cajun, and Creole cuisine in Portland, Oregon. Alkebulan Moroski began operating as a food cart in 2020 and opened a brick and mortar restaurant in 2021.

Description
Dirty Lettuce serves vegan Southern, Cajun, and Creole cuisine, including plant-based "meats" such as seitan barbecue ribs and Ota tofu fried "chicken". Sides include fried okra, jambalaya, macaroni and cheese, sour cream and onion mashed potatoes, Southern-style leaf vegetables, a Nachitoches meat pie, bowls similar to KFC's Famous Bowl, shrimp-and-grit fritters, candied yams, and corn muffins.

History
With assistance from his mother Kim, Alkebulan Moroski began operating Dirty Lettuce as a food cart in northeast Portland's Shady Pines pod (5240 Northeast 42nd Avenue) in early 2020. He opened a brick and mortar restaurant on Northeast Fremont in the Cully neighborhood (at the Rose City Park border) in May 2021, and planned to continue operating the food cart as of March. However, Shady Pines closed in late 2021.

Reception
According to The Oregonian  Michael Russell, Dirty Lettuce was among the "new generation" of vegan restaurants which saw a "pandemic-era explosion". He called the restaurant a "rising star" of Shady Pines. Similarly, Willamette Week Shannon Gormley called Dirty Lettuce the "biggest breakout success" of Shady Pines, Portland's only vegan food pod until closing. She also described restaurant as one of several local "breakout" vegan establishments opened in 2020.

Waz Wu included Dirty Lettuce in Eater Portland 2021 lists of the city's 15 "essential" vegan and vegetarian restaurants and "13 Vegan Food Carts to Visit in Portland and Beyond". The website's Ron Scott and Nathan Williams included the restaurant in a 2022 list of "13 Spots for Serious Soul Food in Portland and Beyond".

See also

 List of Black-owned restaurants
 List of Cajun restaurants
 List of Southern restaurants
 List of vegetarian restaurants

References

External links

 

2020 establishments in Oregon
Black-owned restaurants in the United States
Cajun restaurants in the United States
Creole restaurants in the United States
Cully, Portland, Oregon
Food carts in Portland, Oregon
Restaurants established in 2020
Restaurants in Portland, Oregon
Southern restaurants
Vegan restaurants in Oregon